Cocooning is the practice of coating stored equipment or machinery (typically aircraft) for protection.

See also
Aircraft boneyard

References

Aircraft recycling